Pic Nic railway station, alternatively Pic-Nic, Pic-nic
or  Picnic, was a railway station in Melbourne, Australia. It was located on the Hawthorn line (now the Alamein, Belgrave and Lilydale lines), on the Melbourne side of the Hawthorn Railway Bridge,
between Church Street (now East Richmond) and Hawthorn stations.

The line to the station was opened by the Melbourne and Suburban Railway Company on 24 September 1860, and extended to Hawthorn in 1861 with the completion of the Hawthorn Railway Bridge across the Yarra River.  The station closed on 19 July 1898.

The station was the scene of a serious accident on 2 December 1882, when two trains collided head-on. One person was killed and 178 injured when a special train, returning from land sales at Box Hill, collided with a scheduled train from Melbourne to Camberwell.

References

Disused railway stations in Melbourne
Railway stations in Australia opened in 1860
Railway stations closed in 1898
1898 disestablishments in Australia